Delger (Wide) is a sum (district) of Govi-Altai Province in western Mongolia. In the northern part of the sum lies the settlement of Guulin. In 2009, its population was 3,104.

References 

Populated places in Mongolia
Districts of Govi-Altai Province